Topi is a town in the eastern part of the Swabi District of Khyber Pakhtunkhwa, Pakistan. Topi is administratively subdivided into two Union councils: Topi East and Topi West.

Geography
Topi is located in the east of Swabi District of the Khyber Pukhtoonkwa Province of Pakistan. 
Topi is located to the west of the Tarbela Dam, the world's largest earth filled dam. Tarbela Dam is the largest hydroelectric generation project in Pakistan, producing 3,495 megawatts of electricity accounting for 40 percent of the Water and Power Development Authority's total power output as of 1980.

Tarbela Dam
The Tarbela Dam is at a narrow spot in the Indus River valley, named after the town of Tarbela. Tarbela Dam is located in the Swabi (Topi) and Haripur Districts of Khyber Pakhtunkhwa, Pakistan.

A pair of concrete auxiliary dams spans the river from the island to river left. The dam's two spillways are on the auxiliary dams rather than the main dam. Annually, over 70% of water discharged at Tarbela passes over the spillways and is not used for hydropower generation.

Five large tunnels were constructed as part of Tarbela Dam's outlet works. Hydroelectricity is generated from turbines in tunnel 1 through 3, while tunnels 4 and 5 were designed for irrigation use. Both tunnels are to be converted to hydropower tunnels to increase Tarbela's electricity-generating capacity. These tunnels were originally used to divert the Indus River while the dam was being constructed.

MA hydroelectric power plant on the right side of the main dam houses 14 generators fed with water from outlet tunnels 1, 2, and 3. There are four 175 MW generators on tunnel 1, six 175 MW generators on tunnel 2, and four 432 MW generators on tunnel 3, for a total generating capacity of 3,478 MW.

There are two main Indus River tributaries upstream of the Tarbela Dam. These are the Shyok River, joining near Skardu, and the Siran River near Tarbela.

Ghazi-Barotha Hydropower Project
The Ghazi-Barotha Hydropower Project is a 1,450 MW run-of-the-river hydropower connected to the Indus River near Topi. Construction of the project that began in 1995 consists of 5 generators each with a maximum power generation capacity of 290MW. Inauguration of the plant on 19 August 2003 by President General Pervez Musharraf  also saw the commissioning of the first 2 of the 5 generators i.e. Unit 1 and Unit 2. The last generator was commissioned on 6 April 2004 and the project was completed by that December. It cost US$2.1 billion with funding from Pakistan's Water and Power Development Authority (WAPDA), the World Bank, Asian Development Bank, Japan Bank for International Cooperation, Kreditanstalt für Wiederaufbau, European Investment Bank and Islamic Development Bank.

About 1,600 cubic meter per second of water is diverted from the Indus River near the town of Ghazi, Khyber Pakhtunkhwa, about 7 km downstream of Tarbela Dam (3,478 MW). It then runs through a 100 metre wide and 9 metre deep open power channel which is entirely concrete along its 52 km length down to the village of Barotha where the power complex is located. In the reach from Ghazi to Barotha, the Indus River inclines by 76 meters over a distance of 63 km. After passing through the powerhouse, the water is returned to the Indus. In addition to these main works, transmission lines stretch 225 km.

Education sector
The town of Topi is home of the Ghulam Ishaq Khan Institute of Engineering Sciences and Technology (GIKI), named after Ghulam Ishaq Khan, a former President of Pakistan who had served at Topi during his illustrious career as a civil servant.

Notable people

Sahibzada Abdul Qayyum Khan, a Pashtun educationist and politician, was born in Topi
Bayazid Pir Roshan, the sixteenth century revolutionary Pashtun leader, died in Topi

Notes

References

Populated places in Swabi District